Carite may refer to:

Carites, a people mentioned in the Bible
Carite, Guayama, Puerto Rico, barrio in Puerto Rico
Carite Lake in Puerto Rico
Carite State Forest in Puerto Rico
ARV Carite (S-11), a Venezuela submarine
Cero (fish), also called carite